Saint James Lutheran Church and School located in Lafayette, Indiana was founded in 1850 by German immigrants, is a member of the Lutheran Church–Missouri Synod and is a Confessional Lutheran congregation with approximately 800 active members. Average weekly worship attendance is approximately 550 at four services.

The school associated with the church was also founded in 1850, and is the oldest school in Tippecanoe County. The school serves children from age 2 through grade 8. Current enrollment is approximately 225. Saint James Lutheran School is accredited by the state of Indiana, and National Lutheran School Accreditation.

Pastors
 Rev. Edo Lemhuis (1850–1851)
 Rev. G. Frederick Koenig (1852–1858)
 Rev. Henry Schoeneberg (1858–1889)
 Rev. George M. Schumm (1889–1916)
 Rev. Paul G. Schmidt (1916–1951)
 Rev. Kenneth R. Schueler (1951–1959)
 (Vicar David Young) (1959–1960)
 Rev. Marcus T. Lang (1960–after 1975)
 Rev. Daniel P. May (after 1975–2003) (elected president of Indiana District (LCMS) in June 2003)
 Rev. David R. French (2004–present)

See also
 Centennial Neighborhood District

Notes and references

External links
 St. James Evangelical Lutheran Church 
 St. James Lutheran School

German-American culture in Indiana
19th-century Lutheran churches in the United States
Lutheran churches in Indiana
Lutheran schools in Indiana
Lutheran Church–Missouri Synod churches
Historic district contributing properties in Indiana
Churches on the National Register of Historic Places in Indiana
Religious organizations established in 1850
1850 establishments in Indiana
National Register of Historic Places in Tippecanoe County, Indiana